David Alexander (born October 29, 1952 in Jackson, Mississippi) is an American politician and a Republican member of the Tennessee House of Representatives representing District 39 since January 2011.

Education
Alexander earned his BA in English literature from Mississippi College.

Elections
2012 Alexander was unopposed for the August 2, 2012 Republican Primary, winning with 4,436 votes, and won the November 6, 2012 General election with 15,097 votes (65.7%) against Democratic nominee Doug Clark.
2010 To challenge District 39 incumbent Democratic Representative George Fraley, Alexander was unopposed for the August 5, 2010 Republican Primary, winning with 5,405 votes, and won the November 2, 2010 General election with 11,566 votes (65.7%) against Representative Fraley.

References

External links
Official page at the Tennessee General Assembly

David Alexander at Ballotpedia
David Alexander at OpenSecrets

1952 births
Living people
Republican Party members of the Tennessee House of Representatives
Mississippi College alumni
People from Winchester, Tennessee
Politicians from Jackson, Mississippi
21st-century American politicians